Ori Gersht (born 1967) is an Israeli fine art photographer. He is a professor of photography at the University for the Creative Arts in Rochester, Kent, England.

Biography
Ori Gersht was born in Tel Aviv. He graduated in Photography, Film and Video from University of Westminster, London and studied for an M.A. in Photography from the Royal College of Art, London.

Art career
Gersht has exhibited widely in museums and galleries since the early 1990s. He is represented by Angles Gallery in Los Angeles, CRG Gallery in New York, Ben Brown Fine Arts in London, and Noga Gallery in Tel Aviv. In 2012, Gersht's show History Repeating was mounted at the Museum of Fine Arts, Boston.

Artistic themes
Gersht engages the themes of life, death, violence, and beauty. His photographs and films transcribe  images of sites of historical significance—the Judean Desert, Sarajevo, Auschwitz, the Galicia region of Ukraine, the Lister Route in the Pyrenees (on which Walter Benjamin made his ill-fated exodus from Nazi-occupied France)—into ciphers of psychological disruption. Such scenes may not seem out of the ordinary unto themselves, but, through the artist’s focused attention and treatment they evoke the emotional resonance of what has transpired—most often, violence, and, more significantly, the ghosts of war’s most egregious detritus, its refugees.
Pervasive in Gersht’s work is the landscape, as a place, an idea, and an art historical trope. His films and photographs may be compared to paintings in their display—from their unhindered access (no Plexiglas separates their surfaces from the viewer) to the frames surrounding the monitors on which the films often play. Moreover, the vistas and horizons of, for instance, "Between Places" (1998–2000), "White Noise" (1999–2000), "The Clearing/Liquidation" (2005), and "Evaders" (2009), recall Romantic depictions of the sublime. They conjure precedents in both photography, such as the vistas of Andreas Gursky and the landscapes of the American South by Sally Mann, and painting, by J.M.W. Turner, Caspar David Friedrich, and even Mark Rothko.

In his  still life series Gersht investigated the relationships between photography, technology and optical perception, at a pivotal moment in the history of photography where digital technology both threatens a crisis and promises a breakthrough. Research into the early history of the medium of photography is brought together with theoretical discourse, creating, still image and films that (literally) explode the genre of still life, the beautiful and destructive results captured using cutting-edge technology. In "Pomegranate", a film that references Juan Sanchez Cotan’s 17th-century still life and Harold Edgerton’s stroboscopic photography, a high velocity bullet flies across the frame in slow motion and obliterates a suspended pomegranate fruit, bursting it open and wheeling it slowly into the air like a smashed violated mouth spraying seeds. A peaceful image is transformed into bloodshed, and a dialogue is established between stillness and motion, peace and violence.

Gersht’s photographs and films provide a meditation on life, loss, destiny and chance.  Allusions to the catastrophic violence of the French Revolution, the Spanish Civil War, the bombing of Hiroshima, and the suicide bombs that Gersht anticipated during his childhood in Israel can all be found in this work.  As such, it reminds us of our past, present, and future, and, above all, the fragility of life itself.

Awards and recognitions 
 1990 South Bank Photo Show, London
 1993 Department of Transport Art Competition, London
 1997 Residency at Whitefield School, Barnet
 2000 The Constantiner Photographer Award for an Israeli Artist, Tel Aviv Museum of Art, Tel Aviv
 2002 Consultant to the Architectural Development Planning of the South London Gallery
 2004 First Prize winner, Onfuri International, Tirana, Albania

Solo exhibitions 
 2014 - Ori Gersht: Still Life, Columbus Museum of Art, USA
 2014 - Ori Gersht: Portraits, Pizzuti Collection, Columbus, USA
 2014 - All Will Come To Pass, The Center for Contemporary Art, Tel Aviv, Israel
 2012 - History Repeating, Museum of Fine Arts, Boston, USA.
 2012 - This Storm is What We Call Progress, Imperial War Museum, London.
 2011 - Lost in Time, Santa Barbara Museum of Art, Santa Barbara, California, USA
 2009 - Black Box, Hirshhorn Museum and Sculpture Garden, Washington DC, USA
 2008 - Selected Films, Hirshhorn Museum and Sculpture Garden, Washington, USA
 2008 - The Forest, Musée d’Art de Toulon, Toulon, France
 2008 - Pomegranate, The Jewish Museum, New York
 2007 - Time After Time: Exploding Flowers & Other Matters, The Armory Show (with CRG Gallery), New York, USA
 2007 - The Forest & Blow Up, Yale Center for British Art, New Haven, USA
 2006 - The Forest, Tel Aviv Museum of Art, Tel Aviv, Israel
 2006 - The Clearing, The Photographers' Gallery, London, UK
 2004 - History in the Making, Photo España, Madrid, Spain
 2002 - Afterglow, Art Now Room, Tate Britain, London, UK
 2002 - Afterglow, Helena Rubenstein Pavilion for Contemporary Art, Tel Aviv Museum of Art, Tel Aviv, Israel

Group exhibitions 
 2012 - Seduced by Art, National Gallery, London
 2011 - Evaders & Falling Bird, Tel Aviv Museum of Art, Israel
 2011 - When a Painting Moves… Something Must be Rotten, The Stenersen Museum, Oslo, Norway
 2011 - Eating Art, Casa Milà, Barcelona, Spain
 2010 - Haunted: Contemporary Photography/Video/Performance, Guggenheim Museum, New York, USA
 2010 - Still / Moving, The Israel Museum, Jerusalem
 2010 - Beijing International Art Biennale 2010, National At Museum, Beijing, China
 2010 - Atlantis II, Rohkunstbau, Berlin, Germany
 2010 - Paysage, Musée d’Art, Toulon, France
 2009 - Hugging and Wrestling: Contemporary Israeli Photography and Video, Museum of Contemporary Art Cleveland, USA
 2009 - Flower Power, Villa Giulia – Centro Ricerca Arte Attuale, Turin, Italy
 2009 - Cuando una pintura se mueve... algo debe estar podrido!, Museo de Arte de Puerto Rico, San Juan, Puerto Rico
 2008 - Pomegranate: The Jewish Museum, New York, USA
 2008 - Mutation II, Paris, Kulturprojekte, Berlin, Fotofo, Bratislave, Vladmir Und Estragon, Vienna, Association Café Crème, Luxembourg, Musee de la Photographie, Moscou, Zone Attive, Rome
 2007 - Video Killed the Painting Star, Museum of Salamanca, Spain
 2007 - In Focus: Living History, Tate Modern, London
 2007 - Single Shot, Tate Britain, London
 2007 - 1st Architecture, Art and Landscape Biennial of the Canaries, Canary Islands, Spain
 2006 - Inside-Out: Contemporary Artists from Israel, Museum MARCO, Vigo, Spain
 2006 - Forest Primeval, MOCA (GA), Atlanta, USA
 2006 - Twillight: Photography in the Magic Hour, Victoria and Albert Museum, London
 2005 - Dreams and Trauma, Haus der Kulturen der Welt, Berlin, Germany
 2003 - One Ground, California Museum of Photography, Riverside, USA
 2002 - Reality Check: Recent Developments in British Photography and Video, curated by Kate Bush and Brett Rogers, Galerie Rudolfinum, Prague, Czech Republic
 2002 - Non-Places, Frankfurter Kunstverein, Frankfurt am Main, Germany

See also
Visual arts in Israel

References

Further reading 
 Al Miner, Yoav Rinon, Ronni Baer, Ori Gersht: History Repeating, Museum of Fine Arts, Boston, 2012, 
 Carol Armstrong, Julie Joyce, Michele Robecchi, Ori Gersht: Lost in Time, Santa Barbara Museum of Art, 2011, 
 Jeremy Millar, Ori Gersht: The Clearing, London, Film and Video Umbrella, 2005, 
 Inigo Asis, Tracey Ferguson, Nicola Schwartz, Ori Gersht: Day by Day, London, Pocko Editions, 2002,

External links
 
 
 

Israeli photographers
Living people
Jewish artists
People from Tel Aviv
Israeli expatriates in the United Kingdom
1967 births
Academics of the University for the Creative Arts
Israeli contemporary artists
Fine art photographers